The 1985 Montana Grizzlies football team represented the University of Montana in the 1985 NCAA Division I-AA football season as a member of the Big Sky Conference (Big Sky). The Grizzlies were led by sixth-year head coach Larry Donovan, played their home games at Dornblaser Field in Missoula, and finished with three wins and eight losses (3–8, 2–5 Big Sky).

In the season finale at Northern Arizona, the Griz rallied to win by a point and snap a five-game losing streak. Two days later, Donovan and his staff were fired.

Schedule

References

External links
Montana Grizzlies football – 1985 media guide

Montana
Montana Grizzlies football seasons
Montana Grizzlies football